The Palm Springs Walk of Stars is a walk of fame in downtown Palm Springs, California, where "Golden Palm Stars", honoring various people who have lived in the greater Palm Springs area, are embedded in the sidewalk pavement. The walk includes portions of Palm Canyon Drive, Tahquitz Canyon Way, La Plaza Court and Museum Drive. Among those honored are Presidents of the United States, show business personalities, literary figures (authors, playwrights, screenwriters), pioneers and civic leaders (early settlers, tribal leaders, civic personalities), humanitarians, and Medal of Honor recipients. This listing is a selection of notable people so honored.

The Palm Springs Walk of Stars was established in 1992 by Gerhard Frenzel and Barbara Foster-Henderson. The first induction ceremony was held on February 26, 1992, and included Walk of Fame chairman Johnny Grant. The first five Golden Palm Stars were dedicated to Earle C. Strebe, William Powell, Ruby Keeler, Charles Farrell and Ralph Bellamy. In May 2017 the Walk of Stars sponsor and City of Palm Springs announced a temporary suspension of installing new stars while they reviewed the selection criteria.

Honorees

Medal of Honor recipients
Five Medal of Honor recipients from the Coachella Valley were honored during the 1999 Veterans Day holiday.

Former Presidents
These former Presidents of the United States lived in the Palm Springs area after their retirement.

Show business
Palm Springs has been famous as a winter resort and second home community for personalities in show business. These honorees include, among others, notable actors, performers, directors, producers, and cinematographers of film, radio, stage, and television.

Pioneers, civic leaders, and other contributors
Early pioneers and other contributors to the community are also honored.

Literary
These honorees include authors, playwrights, screenwriters, singers, composers and musicians.

See also

 List of people from Palm Springs, California
 List of walks of fame
 List of mayors of Palm Springs, California

Notes

References

Further reading

External links
 Palm Springs Walk of Stars Chamber of Commerce – official website for Walk of Stars

Palm Springs, California
Walks of fame
People
Halls of fame in California
Lists of celebrities
Palm Springs, California
Lists of people from California
Tourist attractions in Palm Springs, California
1992 establishments in California